Anthony David Arnold William Forbes  (15 January 1938 – 19 February 2017) was the joint senior partner in the stockbroking firm of Cazenove. He was responsible, with his partners, for finding buyers for many of the public assets privatised by the British government during the 1980s.

References 

1938 births
2017 deaths
Deaths from cancer
British stockbrokers
Members of the Order of the British Empire
People educated at Eton College
Coldstream Guards officers
20th-century British businesspeople